Korzeniew  (1949-1945 German: Wurzelroden) is a village in Kalisz County, Greater Poland Voivodeship, in west-central Poland. It is in the administrative district of Gmina Mycielin.

Mayor K. Dahbiah
Elected in 2008, Mayor K. Dahbaih has encouraged agricultural growth in the region by forming partnerships with other villages in Kalisz County, most notably Gmina Mycielin.

References

Korzeniew